Events from the year 1758 in Great Britain.

Incumbents
 Monarch – George II
 Prime Minister – Thomas Pelham-Holles, 1st Duke of Newcastle (Whig)
 Parliament – 11th

Events
 15 April – Samuel Johnson begins publishing the series of essays The Idler (1758–1760) in the Universal Chronicle.
 21 April – Thomas Secker enthroned as Archbishop of Canterbury.
 24 April – Robert Dodsley and his brother James sign a contract with Edmund Burke to launch The Annual Register.
 29 April – Seven Years' War: Battle of Cuddalore: A British fleet under George Pocock engages the French fleet of Anne Antoine d'Aché indecisively near Madras.
 23 June – Seven Years' War: Battle of Krefeld:  Anglo-Hanoverian forces under Ferdinand of Brunswick defeat the French.
 8 July – French and Indian War: Battle of Carillon: French forces hold Fort Carillon against British at Ticonderoga, New York.
 3 August – Seven Years' War: At the Battle of Negapatam off the coast of India, Admiral Pocock again engages d'Aché's French fleet, this time with more success.
 14 September – French and Indian War: At the Battle of Fort Duquesne, a British attack on Fort Duquesne is defeated.
 27 October – the ship Dublin Trader (Captain White) leaves Parkgate, Cheshire, for Dublin, and founders in the Irish Sea; she carries 70,000 Irish pounds in money and £80,000 in goods, while among the 60 passengers lost are Edward, fifth Earl of Drogheda, Theophilus Cibber, the actor, and (probably) the Irish mezzotint engraver Michael Ford.
 25 November – French and Indian War: French forces abandon Fort Duquesne to the British who then name the area Pittsburgh.

Births
 9 January – George Leveson-Gower, 1st Duke of Sutherland (died 1833)
 24 January – Frederick Ponsonby, 3rd Earl of Bessborough (died 1844)
 4 February – George Thicknesse, 19th Baron Audley (died 1818)
 12 February – David Ochterlony, general (died 1825)
 17 February – John Pinkerton, antiquarian (died 1826)
 23 February – Francis Napier, 8th Lord Napier (died 1823)
 4 April – John Hoppner, English portrait-painter (died 1810)
 23 April 
 Alexander Hood, Royal Navy officer (killed in action 1798)
 Alexander Cochrane, Royal Navy officer, admiral (died 1832)
 Philip Gidley King, Royal Navy officer and colonial administrator (died 1808)
 30 April – Jane West, writer (died 1852)
 April – Herod, racehorse (died 1780)
 15 May – Thomas Taylor, neoplatonist translator (died 1835)
 17 May – Sir John St Aubyn, 5th Baronet, fossil collector (died 1839)
 30 June – James Stephen, lawyer (died 1832)
 25 July – Elizabeth Hamilton, writer (died 1816)
 24 August
 Edward James Eliot, politician (died 1797)
 Thomas Picton, soldier and colonial administrator (killed in action 1815)
 25 August – Israel Pellew, Royal Navy officer (died 1832)
 1 September – George Spencer, 2nd Earl Spencer, Whig politician (died 1834)
 9 September – Alexander Nasmyth, portrait and landscape painter (died 1840)
 29 September – Horatio Nelson, 1st Viscount Nelson, Royal Navy officer, admiral (killed in action 1805)
 6 October – Watkin Tench, Marine officer (died 1833)
 28 October – John Sibthorp, botanist (died 1796)
 5 December – George Beauclerk, 4th Duke of St Albans (died 1787)
 9 December – Richard Colt Hoare, antiquarian and archaeologist (died 1838)

Deaths
 7 January – Allan Ramsay, poet (born 1686 in Scotland)
 17 January – James Hamilton, 6th Duke of Hamilton, peer (born 1724)
 10 February – Thomas Ripley, architect (born 1683)
 6 March – Henry Vane, 1st Earl of Darlington, politician (born c. 1705)
 18 March – Matthew Hutton, Archbishop of Canterbury (born 1693)
 22 March – Richard Leveridge, bass and composer (born 1670)
 6 July – George Howe, 3rd Viscount Howe, general (killed in battle) (born c. 1725)
 18 July – Duncan Campbell, soldier (year of birth unknown)
 2 August – George Booth, 2nd Earl of Warrington (born 1675)
 2 October (bur.) – Philip Southcote, landscape gardener (born 1698)
 12 October – Richard Molesworth, 3rd Viscount Molesworth, field marshal (born 1680)
 14 October – Francis Edward James Keith, soldier and field marshal (born 1696)
 20 October – Charles Spencer, 3rd Duke of Marlborough, politician (born 1706)
 c.27/8 October – Theophilus Cibber, actor (born 1703)
 12 November – John Cockburn, Scottish politician 
 22 November – Richard Edgcumbe, 1st Baron Edgcumbe, politician (born 1680)
 15 December – John Dyer, poet (born 1699)
 25 December – James Hervey, clergyman and writer (born 1714)

References

Further reading
 

  
Years in Great Britain